Monamphiura is a genus of brittle star echinoderms of the family Amphiuridae.

Species
 Monamphiura sundevalli
 Monamphiura apicula (Cherbonnier, 1957) 
 Monamphiura proposita 
 Monamphiura algida Fell, 1962
 Monamphiura alba Fell, 1962a
 Monamphiura heraldica Fell, 1962a
 Monamphiura aster

References
 
 Miller M & Batt G, Reef and Beach Life of New Zealand, William Collins (New Zealand) Ltd, Auckland, New Zealand 1973

Amphiuridae
Ophiuroidea genera